Shadrach Lambeth House, also known as Pennington Place and Shoaf House, is a historic home located near Thomasville, Davidson County, North Carolina. It was built about 1837, and is a two-story, three bay by two bay, Federal style brick dwelling.  It has a one-story brick kitchen addition added in the late-19th century.

It was added to the National Register of Historic Places in 1984.

References

Houses on the National Register of Historic Places in North Carolina
Federal architecture in North Carolina
Houses completed in 1837
Houses in Davidson County, North Carolina
National Register of Historic Places in Davidson County, North Carolina
Thomasville, North Carolina